Tom McNeal (born Santa Ana, California November 1947) is an American novelist and short story writer.

Biography
Tom McNeal was educated at the University of California and Stanford University, where he was a Stegner Fellow and Jones Lecturer.  He spent parts of boyhood summers at the Nebraska farm where his mother was born and raised, and later taught school in the nearby town that was the inspiration for his first novel, Goodnight, Nebraska, which won the James A. Michener Prize and the California Book Award.  To Be Sung Underwater, his second novel, is set in both in California and Nebraska, and was named one of the 5 Best Novels of the Year by USA Today.  His short fiction has been included in Best American Short Stories, The O. Henry Prize Collection and The Pushcart Prize Collection, and "What Happened to Tully," which first appeared in The Atlantic Monthly, was made into the movie Tully.  Additionally, with his wife, Laura Rhoton McNeal, he has co-authored four YA novels (Crooked; Zipped; Crushed; The Decoding of Lana Morris), all published by Knopf.  Far Far Away, his newest book for younger readers, was published in 2013 and was a National Book Award Finalist, Edgar Award Finalist, winner of the California Book Award, winner of the Southern California Independent Booksellers Award, a Publishers Weekly Best Book of the Year, a School Library Journal Best Book of the Year, a Horn Book Fanfare Best book of the Year, and an ALA-YALSA Top Ten Best Fiction for Young Adults.

Tom lives in Coronado, California with his wife Laura, their sons Sam and Hank and the family mini-dachshund Link.

Novels and short stories 
 Far Far Away Knopf 2013 
 To Be Sung Underwater Hachette 2011 
 California's Best: Two Centuries of Great Writing from the Golden State 2009 Edited by Peter Fish, Far Country Press 
 The Decoding of Lana Morris (with co-author Laura McNeal) Knopf 2007 
 Crushed (with Laura McNeal) Knopf 2005 
 "Watermelon Days" Zoetrope: All Story 
 Best American Short Stories 2002 ("Watermelon Days") Mariner Books 
 Zipped (with Laura McNeal) Knopf 2000 
 Goodnight, Nebraska Random House 1998 
 Crooked (with Laura McNeal) Knopf 1998 
 "What Happened to Tully" Prize Stories 1992: The O. Henry Awards Anchor Press 
 The Dog Who Lost His Bob (with Laura McNeal) Albert Whitman 1996 

Internet page: https://web.archive.org/web/20140910195613/http://mcnealbooks.com/home.aspx

References

Living people
1947 births
American male writers
Stegner Fellows